The 2016–17 FIS Cross-Country World Cup Finals were the 9th edition of the FIS Cross-Country World Cup Finals, an annual cross-country skiing mini-tour event. The three-day event was held in Québec City, Canada. It began on 17 March 2017 and concluded on 19 March 2017. It was the final competition round of the 2016–17 FIS Cross-Country World Cup.

Alex Harvey of Canada and Stina Nilsson of Sweden won the first stage of the mini-tour; a sprint freestyle. Johannes Høsflot Klæbo of Norway took over the men's overall leadership after winning the second stage. Klæbo won the overall standings by defending his leading positions on the third stage.
Marit Bjørgen of Norway won the two last stages; a mass start classic and a pursuit freestyle. She surpassed Heidi Weng; the leader of the ladies' overall standings after two stages, on the final stage.

Overall leadership
The results in the overall standings were calculated by adding each rider's finishing times on each stage. On the sprint stage, the winners were awarded 30 bonus seconds. On the second stage, the three fastest skiers in finish were awarded 15, 10 and 5 bonus seconds, and the ten first skiers to pass the intermediate sprint points were also awarded bonus seconds. No bonus seconds were awarded on the third stage. The skier with the lowest cumulative time was the overall winner of the Cross-Country World Cup Finals.

Overall standings

Stages

Stage 1
17 March 2017
 The skiers qualification times counted in the overall standings. Bonus seconds were awarded to the 30 skiers that qualifies for the quarter-finals, distributed as following:
 Final: 30–27–24–23–22–21
 Semi-final: 16–15–14–13–12–11
 Quarter-final: 5–5–5–4–4–4–4–4–3–3–3–3–3–2–2–2–2–2

Stage 2
18 March 2017
Bonus seconds:
 Men: 2 intermediate sprints, bonus seconds to the 10 first skiers (15–12–10–8–6–5–4–3–2–1) past the intermediate points.
 Women: 1 intermediate sprint, bonus seconds to the 10 first skiers (15–12–10–8–6–5–4–3–2–1) past the intermediate point.
 Bonus seconds in finish: 15–10–5 to the 3 first skiers crossing the finish line.

Stage 3

19 March 2017
The race for "Winner of the Day" counted for 2016–17 FIS Cross-Country World Cup points. No bonus seconds were awarded on this stage.

World Cup points distribution
The overall winners were awarded 200 points. The winners of each of the three stages are awarded 50 points. The maximum number of points an athlete could earn was therefore 350 points.

References 

2017
2017 in cross-country skiing
March 2017 sports events in Canada
Cross-country skiing competitions in Canada